The 1919 Mecklenburg-Schwerin state election was held on 26 January 1919 to elect the 64 members of the Landtag of the Free State of Mecklenburg-Schwerin.

Results

References 

Mecklenburg-Schwerin
Elections in Mecklenburg-Western Pomerania